Amália is a 2008 Portuguese biographical film directed by Carlos Coelho da Silva and starring Sandra Barata, Carla Chambel and José Fidalgo. Barata portrays legendary Portuguese fado singer Amália Rodrigues; songs used in the film are recordings of Amália. The film has been criticised by some members of her family.

References

External links 
 

2000s biographical films
2008 films
Biographical films about singers
Cultural depictions of folk musicians
Cultural depictions of Portuguese women
Films set in Portugal
Films shot in Portugal
Portuguese biographical films
2000s Portuguese-language films